Markgrafneusiedl is a town in the district of Gänserndorf in the Austrian state of Lower Austria.

Geography
Markgrafneusiedl lies east of Vienna and southeast of Deutsch-Wagram in the Marchfeld, which is part of the Weinviertels. About 8.07 percent of the municipality is forested.

References

Cities and towns in Gänserndorf District